Virginia's ninth congressional district is a United States congressional district in the Commonwealth of Virginia, covering much of the southwestern part of the state. The 9th is Virginia's second-largest district in area, covering 9,113.87 square miles (slightly larger than the whole state of New Jersey). It has been represented by Republican Morgan Griffith since 2011. He took office after defeating 14-term incumbent Democrat Rick Boucher.

The Ninth was the most competitive Virginia congressional district in the early 20th century, when the state was part of the Solid South. For twenty years (1903-1923), it was the only congressional district in Virginia – and one of the few in the entire former Confederacy – to be represented by a Republican. The district alternated between Democratic and Republican representation over the rest of the century. Some of the election results were so close - and questionable - that the district became known as "The Fighting Ninth."

Since the 1990s, the district has increasingly trended Republican in federal and state races, and it is now considered the most Republican district in the state. It last supported a Democrat for president in 1996, and has supported a Democrat in only two statewide contests since then.

The 9th is the only district in Virginia that cast more votes for Hillary Clinton than Barack Obama in the 2008 Democratic Presidential Primary. Clinton won more than 60% of the vote, despite local Congressman Rick Boucher endorsing Obama. Republican presidential candidate John McCain received 59% of the vote in the 9th district in the 2008 General Election, however, his best performance in any of Virginia's eleven congressional districts. Voters in the 9th district supported McCain over Obama in the general election, despite reelecting Democratic Congressman Rick Boucher. In the 2010 midterm elections, in which Democrats lost their majority in Congress, Virginia State Delegate Morgan Griffith unseated Congressman Boucher by aligning Boucher with President Barack Obama and Speaker Nancy Pelosi, both unpopular figures in the district at the time. Since then, the district has not supported a Democrat in a statewide or federal election (as of 2019).

As of 2017, the 9th district had the highest poverty rate of any Virginia congressional district, at 18.7 percent.

Recent election results from statewide races

Area covered
The 9th district covers all or part of the following political subdivisions:

Counties
The entirety of:
Lee
Wise
Dickenson
Buchanan
Scott
Russell
Tazewell
Washington
Smyth
Bland
Giles
Grayson
Wythe
Pulaski
Montgomery
Carroll
Craig
Floyd
Patrick

Portions of:
Alleghany
Roanoke
Henry

Cities
Bluefield
Bristol
Covington
Galax
Martinsville
Norton
Radford
Salem

List of members representing the district

Recent election results

2000

2002

2004

2006

2008

2010

2012

2014

2016

2018

2020

2022

Historical district boundaries

See also 

 Virginia's congressional districts
 List of United States congressional districts

Notes

References

 Congressional Biographical Directory of the United States 1774–present

09
Constituencies established in 1789
1789 establishments in Virginia
Constituencies disestablished in 1863
1863 disestablishments in Virginia
Constituencies established in 1873
1873 establishments in Virginia
Constituencies disestablished in 1933
1933 disestablishments in Virginia
Constituencies established in 1935
1935 establishments in Virginia